Confédération nationale des syndicats du Mali ('National Confederation of Trade Unions of Mali', abbreviated CNSM) was a trade union confederation in the Mali Federation. CNMS was founded at a congress in Dakar April 2–6, 1960, gathering all Senegalese and Soudanese trade unions except CATC. When the Mali Federation was dissolved CNSM was also disbanded and its constituents resumed independent activities.

References

1960 establishments in Mali
Trade unions in Senegal
Trade unions in Mali
Fédération du Mali
Defunct trade unions of Africa
Trade unions established in 1960
Trade unions disestablished in 1960
Defunct organisations based in Mali